Stephan Beckenbauer (1 December 1968 – 31 July 2015) was a German footballer who played as a defender.

Career
Born in Munich, Beckenbauer began playing with local FC Bayern, but never moved past the reserve team during his two-year tenure. He spent the vast majority of his 11-year senior career in the lower leagues, also representing TSV 1860 München, Kickers Offenbach and FC Grenchen.

Beckenbauer's input at the professional level consisted of 12 games in both the Bundesliga and the 2. Bundesliga with 1. FC Saarbrücken, for which he signed in the summer of 1992. He made his debut in the former competition on 14 August 1992 by coming on as a 79th-minute substitute in a 1–1 away draw against Bayer Leverkusen, as the season ended in relegation after an 18th-place finish.

In 1990, Beckenbauer had a trial with Red Star Belgrade, but did not sign. He retired in 1997 at only 28, returning immediately to Bayern and going on to work with the club as a scout and youth coach.

Personal life
Beckenbauer's father, Franz, was also a footballer. He represented Bayern and the West German national team and later managed both, winning a World Cup title both as player (1974) and manager (1990). His son Luca is also a professional footballer, currently playing for SV Wacker Burghausen in the Regionalliga Bayern.

Death
Beckenbauer died of a brain tumor. He was 46.

References

External links

1968 births
2015 deaths
Footballers from Munich
German footballers
Association football defenders
Bundesliga players
2. Bundesliga players
FC Bayern Munich II players
TSV 1860 Munich players
Kickers Offenbach players
1. FC Saarbrücken players
Swiss Challenge League players
FC Grenchen players
German football managers
FC Bayern Munich non-playing staff
German expatriate footballers
German expatriate sportspeople in Switzerland
Expatriate footballers in Switzerland
Deaths from brain cancer in Germany